Yahang (Ya’unk) a.k.a. Ruruhip (Ruruhi’ip) is a Torricelli language of Papua New Guinea. It shares the name Ruruhip with Heyo, which is closely related.

Phonology
Yahang consonants are:

{| 
| p || t || k || ʔ
|-
| f || s ||  || h
|-
|  || r ||  || 
|-
|  || l ||  || 
|-
| w || j ||  || 
|}

Yahang vowels are:
{| 
| i || ɨ || u
|-
| e || ə || o
|-
| a ||  || 
|}

References

External links 
 Paradisec has an open access collection from Don Laycock that includes Yahong language materials

Maimai languages
Languages of Sandaun Province